Andrei Boncea is a Romanian film producer. Boncea is the co-founder of the Romanian film production company FRAME FILM and the theatre company WONDER THEATRE. He served as VP of Content of CME / Central European Media Enterprises and Head of Media Pro Entertainment between 2008 and 2014. From 1998 to 2007 he served as General Director of MediaPro Pictures, one of the leading film and television studios in Eastern Europe.

Producing work
He was a producer for Amen., directed by Costa Gavras, Callas Forever, directed by Franco Zeffirelli, Modigliani, directed by Mick Davis, starring Andy García, and 2006 Academy Award nominee for Foreign Film Merry Christmas, directed by Christian Carion. He has also produced Romanian films such as Furia, directed by Radu Muntean, and California Dreamin', directed by Cristian Nemescu, and television series for Romanian TV channels PRO TV and Acasă TV.

He recently served as executive producer for The Protégé, directed by Martin Campbell, starring Michael Keaton, Maggie Q. and Samuel Jackson.

References

External links
 

Romanian film producers
Film studio executives
Television executives
1972 births
Living people
Romanian television producers